Big Brother Brasil is a Brazilian television show in which contestants (also called housemates) compete against each other to be the last Big Brother house resident and win the grand prize. The series first aired in 2002, and 23 seasons have been filmed as of May 2023.

Big Brother contestants are chosen by the show's producers through an application process that includes a videotape submission, semi-final interviews at select cities, and a final interview in Rio de Janeiro.

A total of 372 participants have competed, and 9 of them have competed in two seasons; in 2010, Joseane Oliveira (13th in season 3) and Marcelo Dourado (7th in season 4) returned to compete in season 10. Joseane placed 17th and Dourado won the game; in 2013, Kleber Bambam (1st in season 1), Dhomini Ferreira (1st in season 3), Fani Pacheco (7th in season 7) Natalia Casassola (3rd in season 8), Elieser Ambrosio and Anamara Barreira (9th and 6th in season 10) returned to compete in season 13. Bambam walked at the end of week 1 and was replaced by Yuri Fernandes (7th in season 12). Dhomini placed 15th, Yuri placed 13th, Elieser placed 10th, Anamara placed 8th, Fani placed 6th and Natalia placed 4th.

The youngest housemates were Elane Silva (season 3) and Juliana Brandão (season 5), who entered the house at age 18. The oldest housemate was Ieda Wobeto from (season 17), who entered the house at age 70.

Contestants

Notes
 Contestant's age at the time the season was filmed.

References

External links
Official
 Big Brother Brazil 14
 Big Brother Brazil 13
 Big Brother Brasil 12
 Big Brother Brasil 11
 Big Brother Brasil 10
 Big Brother Brasil 9
 Big Brother Brasil 8
 Big Brother Brasil 7
 Big Brother Brasil 6
 Big Brother Brasil 5
 Big Brother Brasil 4
 Big Brother Brasil 3
 Big Brother Brasil 2
 Big Brother Brasil 1

 
Lists of reality show participants